No Love for Johnnie is a 1961 British drama film in CinemaScope directed by Ralph Thomas. It was based on the 1959 book of the same title by the Labour Member of Parliament Wilfred Fienburgh, and stars Peter Finch.

It depicts the disillusionment and cynicism of a rebellious leftist Labour MP, who seeks escape in a relationship with a younger woman.

The film had its world premiere on 9 February 1961 at the Leicester Square Theatre in London's West End. It has been called Thomas' best film.

Plot
Johnnie Byrne, a cynical and burnt-out Yorkshire Labour MP, whose career has seemingly stalled due to his ostensibly leftist leanings, is re-elected with the victorious Labour Party after a general election. Bitter not to receive an invitation to join the Government, his left-wing wife leaves him, and he accepts an invitation to lead a conspiratorial group of MPs working against the centrist government. Mary, the single woman upstairs, adores him, but they never quite become a couple.

Johnnie falls in love with a 20-year-old student/model Pauline, and misses making an important speech against the Government's militaristic plans because he is in bed with her. His conspirators turn against him and cause his local party to attempt to deselect him. He suffers a humiliating vote of no-confidence at a meeting of his Constituency Labour Party, but is put on probation. He then goes in search of Pauline, who has ended their relationship, still in love, but knowing it is not the right relationship for her.

He goes back home, to find his wife who wants to try again, and she gives him her phone number to call if he decides he wants her back. Meantime the Prime Minister offers him a junior post, and reveals that the reason Johnnie was not offered one before was due to his wife's communist connections. Johnnie tears up the paper with his wife's phone number and embraces his role in government.

Cast
Peter Finch as Johnnie Byrne 
Stanley Holloway as Fred Andrews 
Mary Peach as Pauline 
Donald Pleasence as Roger Renfrew 
Billie Whitelaw as Mary 
Hugh Burden as Tim Maxwell 
Rosalie Crutchley as Alice
Michael Goodliffe as Dr. West
Mervyn Johns as Charlie Young 
Geoffrey Keen as the Prime Minister
Paul Rogers as Sydney Johnson
Dennis Price as Flagg 
Peter Barkworth as Henderson
Fenella Fielding as Sheila
Derek Francis as Frank
Conrad Phillips as Drake
Gladys Henson as Constituent
Peter Sallis as M.P.

Production
The film was based on a novel by Labor politician Wilfred Fienburgh whose wife later said he wrote it over three months to "make some money". Fienburgh died in a car crash in February 1958 and the novel was published in early 1959. In February 1959 the BBC bought the rights to adapt the book for television. The book was serialised in a newspaper and became a best seller in England for several months. It was picked up for publication in the US.

Film rights were bought by Sydney Box who hired Mordecai Richler to do the script and David Deutsch to produce. Richler said the original hope was for Jack Clayton to direct. However two weeks into Richler working on a script, Box had a heart attack and retired, and Deutsch moved on to another project. No Love for Johnnie transferred to Betty Box and Ralph Thomas.

Box and Thomas had made the "Doctor" comedies for the Rank Organisation, and used this as leverage to get the studio to finance other projects, such as No Love for Johnnie. Ralph Thomas later said "we made that because we wanted to make it very much. We all loved it – Betty, myself, Peter Finch."

Betty Box said she was "very surprised Rank let me do it... because they were very politically conservative as an organisation. Perhaps they liked the Peter Finch character being so corrupt because, after all, he was left-wing. I must say I liked it very much... I enjoyed making it very much. I loved working with Peter Finch. He was drunk some of the time, and not always very easy, but I was just very fond of him. Ralph and I both knew how to work with him."

Filming started in August 1960. Ralph Thomas said "Peter managed to get everything that existed in that man [Fienburgh] on to the screen without ever having known him. People who knew Fienburgh really well identified Peter absolutely with the character."

Music was by Malcolm Arnold, the score containing themes similar to those from Whistle Down the Wind, which he also scored the same year. Arnold produced music scores for more than a hundred films, among these The Bridge on the River Kwai (1957), for which he won an Oscar.

There is a brief appearance of a young Oliver Reed as a bohemian party-goer.

Reception
Thomas says the Labour Party were "enormously supportive" of the film even though it "knocked the Labour Party terribly" and "half the cabinet came to premiere."

Critical
Reviews were very strong, particularly for Finch.

Variety said the film "though not sensational in treatment, it has some earthy sex angles and is a strong, adult film which should hold intelligent audiences. Though it has no obvious stellar value for the U.S., No Love For  Johnnie is a film worth the attention of any out-of-the-rut booker."

Box Office 
Thomas says the film "got great notices although it was never a commercial success, didn't even pay for itself... it very much reflected the politics of the day. The plain fact is that people were not very interested in the politics of the day."

Awards
Finch won two film awards for this performance – one a BAFTA, and the other the Silver Bear for Best Actor at the 11th Berlin International Film Festival. It was Finch's third BAFTA.

The film won Best Film from the British Film Academy.

References

External links

No Love for Johnnie at Letterbox DVD
No Love for Johnnie at BFI

Original novel review at Kirkus

1961 films
British drama films
1961 drama films
CinemaScope films
1960s English-language films
Films based on British novels
British independent films
British black-and-white films
Films directed by Ralph Thomas
Films shot at Pinewood Studios
Films about politicians
Films scored by Malcolm Arnold
1960s British films